Tatyana Mudritskaya (born 17 January 1985 in Mogilev-Podolskiy, Ukraine) is a Kazakhstani female volleyball player. 
She is a member of the Kazakhstan women's national volleyball team, and played for Schweriner SC in 2014. 
She was part of the Kazakhstani national team  at the 2014 FIVB Volleyball Women's World Championship in Italy.

Clubs
 1999-2005  Khimvolokno 
 2005-2007  Galatasaray, Turkey. 
 2007-2008  Rakhat, Kazakhstan. 
 2009  AEL, Limassol, Cyprus
 2011-2013  Anorthosis, Cyprus
 2014  Schweriner SC

References

External links 
 FIVB profile

1985 births
Living people
Kazakhstani women's volleyball players
People from Mohyliv-Podilskyi
Galatasaray S.K. (women's volleyball) players
20th-century Kazakhstani women
21st-century Kazakhstani women